Walter Motz (born 22 March 1909, date of death unknown) was a German cross-country skier who competed in the 1930s. He won a silver medal in the 4 x 10 km at the 1934 FIS Nordic World Ski Championships in Sollefteå. He also competed in the Men's 18 km event at the 1936 Winter Olympics, finishing 18th in a field of 75 competitors.

References
World Championship results 
Walter Motz's profile at Sports Reference.com

German male cross-country skiers
1909 births
Year of death missing
Olympic cross-country skiers of Germany
Cross-country skiers at the 1936 Winter Olympics
FIS Nordic World Ski Championships medalists in cross-country skiing
20th-century German people